Syritta hirta is a species of syrphid fly in the family Syrphidae.

Distribution
Nigeria, Uganda.

References

Eristalinae
Diptera of Africa
Insects described in 1939